Coleophora ossaedeaga is a moth of the family Coleophoridae. It is found in China.

References

ossaedeaga
Moths described in 1998
Moths of Asia